Kétsoprony is a village in Békés County, in the Southern Great Plain region of south-east Hungary.

Geography

Population

References

Populated places in Békés County